Monsoon was an early 1980s UK world/pop trio that consisted of singer Sheila Chandra, record producer Steve Coe, and bass guitarist Martin Smith. Their song "Ever So Lonely" was a number 12 hit single in the UK Singles Chart in 1982.

Midge Ure directed the video for Monsoon's second single, "Shakti", which just missed out on the top 40 in the UK. Monsoon's third single, "Tomorrow Never Knows" (a cover of the Beatles' 1966 song), featured guest appearances from Bill Nelson, Preston Heyman, Dave Balfe (The Teardrop Explodes) and Merrick (Adam and the Ants).

Due to differences with their label, Phonogram, Monsoon dissolved in 1982. Sheila Chandra started a solo career, Steve Coe continued writing and producing her albums, as well as Martin Smith, but often under the name Ganges Orchestra.

Phonogram released Third Eye in 1983, after the act had split up.

A compilation of Monsoon recordings including several previously unreleased tracks was released on CD in 1995 by Phonogram's partner label Mercury Records.

Discography

Albums
 Third Eye (1983), Phonogram
 Monsoon featuring Sheila Chandra (1995, Mercury Records) – re-release of Third Eye includes several previously unreleased tracks

Singles

See also
 List of UK top 10 singles in 2001
 Indian pop

References

External links
 
 SheilaChandra.com

British world music groups
British musical trios
English progressive rock groups
Musical groups established in 1981
Mercury Records artists